Benoît Mottet de La Fontaine (4 July 1745 – 30 April 1820) was a French officer in the navy and colonies ministry. He was the uncle of Agathe de Rambaud.

Life

Mottet was born in château de Compiègne. He died at rue des Capucins, Pondicherry. On his death he was buried in the French cemetery on rue Surcouf in Pondicherry.

1745 births
1820 deaths
French colonial governors and administrators